Aertirrena S.p.A. was a regional airline of Italy, operating in the 1970s.  It was one of the few Italian airlines to operate Soviet aircraft.

History

Aertirrena was founded in 1966 by the Italian employer Fiorenza de Bernardi and former Aeroflot worker Piotr Ivanov. The airline was planned on operating services between Genoa, Rome, Milan, Athens and Florence, but with Soviet capital and investment of Aeroflot, holding a 30% stake, with the remaining 70% in the hands of de Bernardi. The first flight of the airline took off in June 1970 between Genoa and Florence, with a Yakovlev Yak-40 aircraft. The airline grew considerably and incorporated another 2 Yak-40 (although both aircraft operated for Olympic Airways for a time) and increased their flight frequency considerably.

Aertirrena finally consolidated as an important company and grew, with passenger numbers  increasing year by year. However, the strong pressure and competition by Alitalia in the regional routes finally forced Aertirrena to cancel its service in 1975. In the aftermath of Aertirrena's bankruptcy di Bernardi and Ivanov founded Avioligure and obtained a contract with Aeroflot to lease to Avioligure the 3 Yak-40 that had been leased to Aertirrena.

Destinations

National
 Florence
 Genoa
 Milan
 Pisa

International
 Athens

Fleet
 3 Yakovlev Yak-40 (I-JAKA, I-JAKE, I-JAKI, leased from Aeroflot)

See also
 List of defunct airlines of Italy

References

External links
 Yak 40 operators
 Italian operators of the Yak-40 (in italian)

1975 disestablishments in Italy
Defunct airlines of Italy
Transport in Florence
Airlines established in 1966
Airlines disestablished in 1975
Italian companies established in 1966